The Houston riot of 1917 was a mutiny and riot by 156 soldiers from the all-black 24th Infantry Regiment of the United States Army, taking place on August 23, 1917, in Houston, Texas. The incident occurred within a climate of overt hostility from members of the all-white Houston Police Department (HPD) against members of the local black community and black soldiers stationed at Camp Logan. Following an incident where police officers arrested and assaulted some black soldiers, many of their comrades mutinied and marched to Houston, where they opened fire and killed eleven civilians and five policemen. Five soldiers themselves were also killed as a result of the riot. In accordance with policies of the time, the soldiers were tried at three courts-martial; thirteen were executed, and 41 were sentenced to life imprisonment.

Gregg Andrews, author of Thyra J. Edwards: Black Activist in the Global Freedom Struggle, wrote that the riot "shook race relations in the city and created conditions that helped to spark a statewide surge of wartime racial activism".

Preliminary situation

Shortly after the United States declared war on Germany in the spring of 1917, the War Department rushed to construct two new military installations in Harris County, Texas — Camp Logan and Ellington Field. On July 27, 1917, the United States Army ordered the 3rd Battalion of the all-black 24th Infantry Regiment to guard the Camp Logan construction site. The regiment traveled to Houston by train from their camp at Columbus, New Mexico, accompanied by seven commissioned officers.

Precipitating causes
Almost from their arrival, the presence of black soldiers in strictly-segregated Houston raised tensions. Jim Crow laws were in place, and the soldiers were forced to contend with segregated accommodations including drinking facilities at the construction site. Prior to the riot, the soldiers were involved in a number of "clashes" with members of the Houston Police Department (HPD), several of which resulted in the soldiers sustaining injuries after being beaten and attacked.

Around noon August 23, 1917, Lee Sparks and Rufus Daniels, two HPD officers, disrupted a gathering on a street corner in Houston's predominantly-black San Felipe district by firing warning shots. Sparks, pursuing those who fled the gunshots, burst into the home of a local woman named Sara Travers. He did not find any of the citizens he was chasing. Refusing to believe Travers' protestations that she had no knowledge of their whereabouts, Sparks dragged her outside of her house and arrested her.

As Sparks and Daniels called in the arrest from a patrol box, they were approached by Private Alonzo Edwards. Edwards offered to take custody of Travers, but instead was pistol-whipped repeatedly by Sparks and then arrested himself. Later that afternoon, Corporal Charles Baltimore approached Sparks and Daniels to inquire about the status of Edwards. Sparks struck Baltimore with his pistol and fired three shots at him as he fled into a nearby home. Sparks and Daniels pursued Baltimore, eventually finding him under a bed. They pulled him out, beat him, and placed him under arrest.

Rumor reached Camp Logan that Baltimore had been shot and killed. The soldiers immediately began meeting in small groups to vent their anger and eventually a plot their retaliation by initiating a battle with the HPD. An officer from the 24th Infantry Regiment retrieved the injured Baltimore from the police station, which seemed to calm the soldiers for the moment.

The mutiny and riot
The soldiers soon received reports of impending violence by an angry white mob. Major K.S. Snow revoked all passes for the evening and ordered the guard around Camp Logan to be increased, but later that evening stumbled upon a group of men attempting to arm themselves from one of the supply tents. Snow ordered the men to assemble without arms and warned them that it was "utterly foolish, foolhardy, for them to think of taking the law into their own hands." One of the men, who had smuggled his rifle into the formation, fired it and cried out that a mob was approaching the camp. At this point, order broke down completely and the soldiers mobbed the supply tents, grabbing rifles and ammunition in order to protect themselves.

The soldiers began firing indiscriminately into the surrounding buildings. After several minutes of shooting at Camp Logan, Sergeant Vida Henry ordered the men in the area – about 150 – to fill their canteens, grab extra ammunition, and fall in to march on Houston. The group marched through neighborhoods on the outskirts of the city and fired at houses with outdoor lights. They fired on a car with two white occupants, but let a second car with black occupants pass. They marched nearly two and a half miles, all the way to the San Felipe district, before they encountered any police officers. Due to the disorganization of the HPD and the belief that the black soldiers would be unable to arm themselves, officers had been sent out only in small numbers, expecting to quickly subdue unarmed men. The first police casualties occurred when a group of six officers stumbled upon large numbers of armed soldiers. Two policemen (including Daniels) were killed immediately, and one later died of wounds he had sustained.

As the soldiers moved through Houston, an open-topped car carrying a man in an olive-drab uniform approached them. Believing this to be the uniform of a mounted policeman, the soldiers opened fire only to discover later that they had killed Captain Joseph W. Mattes of the Illinois National Guard. The killing of a military officer drove home the seriousness of their uprising and of the consequences faced by black men for attacking white people. At this point, soldiers began to desert the group, and Sergeant Henry led the remainder on a march back to Camp Logan. Just outside the San Felipe district, Henry shook hands with the remaining soldiers and informed them that he planned to kill himself after they left. Despite this vow, Henry's body was found in the area the next day, with a crushed skull and bayonet wound to the shoulder.

By the time the firing ceased seventeen people were dead, including four police officers, nine civilians, and two soldiers. One soldier and a police officer later died from wounds sustained during the riot, and one soldier died from wounds sustained during his capture the next day.

Immediate aftermath
The next morning, Houston was placed under martial law. The remaining soldiers at Camp Logan were disarmed, and a house-to-house search uncovered a number of soldiers hiding within the San Felipe district. Soldiers in local jails were turned over to the Army, and the 3rd Battalion was sent by train back to New Mexico.

In the ensuing court-martial, almost two hundred witnesses testified over twenty-two days, and the transcripts of the testimony covered more than two thousand pages. Author Robert V. Haynes suggests that the Army's Southern Department commanding general, General John Wilson Ruckman was "especially anxious for the courts-martial to begin".

Ruckman had preferred the proceedings take place in El Paso, but eventually agreed to allow them to remain in San Antonio. Haynes posits the decision was made to accommodate the witnesses who lived in Houston, plus "the countless spectators" who wanted to follow the proceedings. Ruckman "urged" the War Department to select a "prestigious court". Three brigadier generals were chosen, along with seven full colonels and three lieutenant colonels. Eight members of the court were West Point graduates. 

The Departmental Judge Advocate General (JAG), Colonel George Dunn, reviewed the record of the first court-martial (known as "the Nesbit Case") and approved the sentences. He forwarded the documents materials to Ruckman on December 3. Six days later, thirteen of the prisoners (including Corporal Baltimore) were told that they would be hanged for murder, but they were not informed of the time or place. The court recommended clemency for a Private Hudson, but Ruckman declined to grant it.

Although 169 witnesses testified at the court-martial, the darkness and rain meant that many of the witnesses were unable to correctly identify any of the alleged assailants. Historians have also questioned the veracity of witness testimony, noting that the some of the witnesses who testified as participants were granted immunity or promised leniency.

The first hanging
The condemned soldiers (one sergeant, four corporals, and eight privates) were transferred to a barracks on December 10. That evening, motor trucks carried new lumber for scaffolds to some bathhouses built for the soldiers at Camp Travis near a swimming pool in the Salado Creek. The designated place of execution was several hundred yards away. Army engineers completed their work by the light of bonfires. The thirteen condemned men were awakened at 5:00 am and taken to the gallows. They were hanged simultaneously, at 7:17am, one minute before sunrise. The scaffolds were disassembled and every piece returned to Fort Sam Houston. The New York Times, commenting on the clean-up operations, observed the place of execution and place of burial were "indistinguishable." The soldiers were buried in unmarked graves by the Salado Creek, their surnames were written on paper placed in empty soda bottles that were buried with each man.

Ruckman told reporters he had personally approved the death sentences and said that forty-one soldiers had been given life sentences and four received sentences of two and a half years or less. He said he was the one who chose the time and place for the executions. Military jurist Frederick Bernays Wiener has observed that Ruckman's approval and execution of the death sentences were "entirely legal" and "in complete conformity" with the 1916 Articles of War.

Second and third courts martial
A second court-martial, the "Washington" case, began six days later. Fifteen men of the Lower A Division were tried and five were sentenced to death. On January 2, 1918, Ruckman approved the sentences in a public statement. But a new rule, General Orders 167 (December 29, 1917), prohibited the execution of any death sentence until the JAG could review the sentences (the JAG Boards of Review tasked with reviewing death sentences were created by a subsequent rule, General Orders 7, on January 7, 1918). Those boards, though they had advisory power only, were the Army's first appellate courts.)

While waiting for the JAG review to occur, Ruckman approved a third court-martial, the "Tillman" case, of forty more soldiers. On March 26, 1918, twenty-three of those forty soldiers were found guilty. Eleven of the twenty-three were sentenced to death and the remaining twelve to life in prison. On May 2, Ruckman approved the sentences.

Wilson's clemency and commentary

On August 31, 1918, President Woodrow Wilson granted clemency to ten soldiers by commuting their death sentences to life in prison. Wilson issued a rare public statement in order that the basis of his action might be "a matter of record."

The President's statement began by recounting the events that led to the deaths of "innocent bystanders" who were "peaceable disposed civilians of the City of Houston." He noted the investigations that followed were "very searching and thorough", in the fashion of most investigations involving alleged attacks by black citizens. In each of the three proceedings, the court was promised to be "properly constituted" and composed of "officers of experience and sobriety of judgment." Wilson also took pains to claim that "extraordinary precautions" were taken to "insure the fairness of the trials" and, in each instance, the rights of the defendants were "surrounded at every point" by the "safeguards" of "a humane administration of the law." As a result, technically there were "no legal errors" which had "prejudiced the rights of the accused."
 
Wilson stated that he affirmed the death sentences of six soldiers because there was "plain evidence" that they "deliberately" engaged in "shocking brutality." On the other hand, he commuted the remaining sentences because he believed the "lesson" of the lawless riot had already been "adequately pointed." He desired the "splendid loyalty" of African American soldiers be recognized and expressed the hope that clemency would inspire them "to further zeal and service to the country."

Most importantly, from Ruckman's standpoint, Wilson (a former law professor) wrote the actions taken by the former Commander of the Southern Department were "legal and justified by the record." Indeed, the President agreed that "a stern redress" of the rioters' "wrongs" was the "surest protection of society against their further recurrence". As historian Calvin C. Smith noted in 1991, there was no proof of a "conspiracy", and many of the sentenced were not conclusively identified in the dark and rainy night as having even participated in the riot, despite the pledge of fair trials and absolute transparency.

Release and rehabilitation
On 14 December 1924, four of the rioters were released on parole, with 34 remaining imprisoned in Fort Leavenworth.

On 8 March 1927, President Calvin Coolidge reduced the sentences for the last 20 imprisoned rioters, making them eligible for parole within one year.

In 1937, the remains of the 13 executed soldiers were exhumed from their unmarked graves and reburied with military headstones in Fort Sam Houston National Cemetery.

As of February 2022, the Pentagon is reviewing a clemency petition for all those convicted in the riot.

Camp Logan today

The area where Camp Logan was located is now called Memorial Park. It is bordered by highways I-10 and I-610.

In popular culture
The hanging of the first 13 soldiers is mentioned in part 4 of the 1979 television miniseries Roots: The Next Generations.
KHOU, a CBS affiliated TV station located in Houston produced a documentary of the riot in 2006 entitled Mutiny on the Bayou: The Camp Logan Story.
The 24th, a movie about the riot, was filmed partly in the Brooklyn-South Square section of Salisbury, North Carolina in June 2019 tells a more balanced version of the events.
Fire and Movement is a newly commissioned public performance by interdisciplinary Chicago-based artist Jefferson Pinder in 2019. The uprising saw African American soldiers of the 3rd Battalion of the 24th United States Infantry revolt and attempt to march on the city police department after experiencing abuse from white citizens and the police in Jim Crow-era Houston. On July 11, 2019, Pinder and a trained group of performers retraced the route taken by African American soldiers. This incident is one of Houston’s most complicated and often-misrepresented historical events.
In August 2021, Latino author and lawyer Jaime Salazar (Legion of the Lost, Escaping the Amazon) released an updated account of the mutiny and courts martial, Mutiny of Rage. The work is published by Rowman & Littlefield and represented by Leticia Gomez of Savvy Literary Agency. A foreword was penned by distinguished military law professor and retired US Army JAG lieutenant colonel Geoffrey Corn. Salazar, a graduate of South Texas College of Law Houston, had access to recently declassified archives, court transcripts, and historical archives.

See also

 1917 in the United States
Woodrow Wilson and race
 History of the African-Americans in Houston
 Turner W. Bell – famous black lawyer who defended some of the soldiers
 Military history of African Americans
 List of incidents of civil unrest in the United States

References

Further reading

 
 James, Rawn Jr. The Double V: How Wars, Protest, and Harry Truman Desegregated America's Military. New York: Bloomsbury Press, 2013. .
 

  (Novelization of the riot.)

External links 

  List of 13 executed
  List of five sentenced to be executed
 
 Symposium: The Largest Murder Trial in American History:  Exploring the Houston Riot of 1917 and its Impact on Military Justice Today

1917 in Texas
1917 murders in the United States
1917 riots
African-American history in Houston
African-American history of the United States military
African-American riots in the United States
August 1917 events
Events that led to courts-martial
History of Houston
Mass murder in 1917
Mutinies in World War I
Riots and civil disorder in Texas
United States home front during World War I